Massenbachhausen is a municipality in the district of Heilbronn in Baden-Württemberg in Germany.

Geographical Location 
Massenbachhausen lies in the west of the district of Heilbronn on the mass stream, a tributary of the flax flows, in turn, into the Neckar. It belongs to the fringe of the metropolitan region of Stuttgart.

Neighboring Communities 
Neighbor cities and communities are (clockwise from east): Schwaigern (district Massenbach), Gemmingen, Kirchardt, Bad Rappenau (all cities are district of Heilbronn) and Heilbronn (district city). With Schwaigern Massenbachhausen has entered into an Agreed administrative community.

Education 
The local primary school is called Lindenhofschule. In Massenbachhausen there are also two kindergartens, a catholic one (Katholischer Kindergarten) and a public one (Kindergarten Schmähling).

References

External links
 

Heilbronn (district)
Württemberg